Bojan Knežević (born 28 January 1997) is a Croatian footballer who plays as a midfielder for Italian Serie D club Termoli.

Club career
Knežević spent his youth years at the academy of Dinamo Zagreb from 2012 to 2014. On 10 May 2014, he made his debut for the team against Istra 1961.

In January 2019, he joined Lokomotiva on loan. In July 2022, Knežević signed a contract with Bulgarian club Hebar.

References

External links

1997 births
Living people
Sportspeople from Bjelovar
Association football midfielders
Croatian footballers
Croatia youth international footballers
Croatia under-21 international footballers
GNK Dinamo Zagreb players
GNK Dinamo Zagreb II players
NK Lokomotiva Zagreb players
NK Olimpija Ljubljana (2005) players
FC Koper players
NK Opatija players
ND Gorica players
FC Hebar Pazardzhik players
Croatian Football League players
First Football League (Croatia) players
Slovenian PrvaLiga players
Slovenian Second League players
First Professional Football League (Bulgaria) players

Croatian expatriate footballers
Croatian expatriate sportspeople in Slovenia
Expatriate footballers in Slovenia
Croatian expatriate sportspeople in Bulgaria
Expatriate footballers in Bulgaria
Croatian expatriate sportspeople in Italy
Expatriate footballers in Italy